Adolf Streckeisen (28 July 1857 – 28 December 1916) was professor of medicine at Basel University, first forensic physician (Gerichtsarzt) of Basel (a post created in 1895) and president of the Basel Mission.

He was the father of geologist Albert Streckeisen.

References
 Institut für Rechtsmedizin, Basel

1857 births
1916 deaths
Academic staff of the University of Basel
Forensic scientists
Swiss physicians